Dr Ruth Adler is a former Australian senior career officer of the Department of Foreign Affairs and Trade (DFAT). Adler has served as Ambassador to Ireland (2013–2016) and High Commissioner to Brunei Darussalam (2006–2009), Counsellor/Deputy Head of Mission, Mexico City (1998–2000), and Second Secretary, Australian Embassy, Manila (1991–1994).

Education 
Adler has a PhD in Latin American history and politics from La Trobe University (1993), a Graduate Certificate of Law (International Law) from the Australian National University (2018), a Graduate Diploma in Foreign Affairs and Trade from the Australian National University (1992) and a Bachelor of Arts (Honours) in Spanish and Latin American Studies from the University of New South Wales (1983).

She is also a graduate of the Australian Institute of Company Directors (GAICD). She is working towards a PhD in international climate law with the Law Faculty of the University of Tasmania beginning in June 2019. Her thesis is titled ‘Finance in the Paris Agreement climate regime: governance, legitimacy and prospects for justice’,

See also 

 List of High Commissioners and Ambassadors of Australia

References

Year of birth missing (living people)
Living people
Ambassadors of Australia to Ireland
High Commissioners of Australia to Brunei
Australian National University alumni
Australian women ambassadors
La Trobe University alumni
University of New South Wales alumni